Sebastiano Deli di Castel Durante was a Roman Catholic prelate who served as Bishop of Bitonto (1538–1544).

Biography
On 11 Jan 1538, Sebastiano Deli di Castel Durante was appointed during the papacy of Pope Paul III as Bishop of Bitonto.
He served as Bishop of Bitonto until his resignation in 1537.

References

External links and additional sources
 (for Chronology of Bishops) 
 (for Chronology of Bishops) 

16th-century Italian Roman Catholic bishops
Bishops appointed by Pope Paul III
Bishops of Bitonto